Wilk-class submarines of the Polish Navy included three boats: ,  and .  They served from 1931 until 1955. The boats were built in France. During World War II, one escaped to Britain and two were interned in Sweden.

The class design was based on that of the French submarine , which had been laid down in 1917 and was in service from 1923 to 1936. Running with diesel engines, they all possessed mine-laying capabilities. They had a top speed of  surfaced, and  submerged.

Boats in class
There were three boats in the Wilk class.

References
Citations

Sources
 R Gardiner, R Chesnau (1980) Conway's All the World's Fighting Ships, Conway Maritime Press

External links
Class description and ship histories 
 Wilk class at uboat.net

Submarine classes
 
 
France–Poland military relations